Rajat Kanta Ray is a historian of South Asian history, specializing in Modern Indian history.

Background

He is the son of Kumud Kanta Ray, ICS who was a Home Secretary of West Bengal in the 1960s. His grandfather, Kamakshya Ray was a contemporary of Rathindranath Tagore in Santiniketan.

Education

He completed his schooling at Ballygunge Government High School, Calcutta, and his B.A. (Honours) in History at Presidency College, Calcutta where he was a student of Ashin Dasgupta. He then completed his Ph.D. under the supervision of Anil Seal at the University of Cambridge.

Career

He was an Assistant Professor of History at the Indian Institute of Management Calcutta. From 1975-1982 he was Reader and then from 1982-2006 he was the Professor and Head of the Department of History at Presidency College, Calcutta. He is one of the longest serving professors of the college. From 2006 to 2011, he was the Upacharya of Visva Bharati. He is now Emeritus Professor of History at Presidency University, Calcutta.

Bibliography

Books
 The Felt Community: Commonality and Mentality Before the Emergence of Indian Nationalism, (Delhi: Oxford University Press, 2007)
 Exploring Emotional History: Gender, Mentality, and Literature in the Indian Awakening (Delhi: Oxford University Press, 2001)
 (ed.) Mind, Body and Society: Life and Mentality in Colonial Bengal (Delhi: Oxford University Press, 1996)
 Palasir Sharayantra O Sekaler Samaj (1994) (in Bengali)
 (ed.) Entrepreneurship and Industry in India 1800-1947 (1994)
 (with Basudeb Chattopadhyay and Hari S. Vasudevan) (eds.), Dissent and Consensus: Protest in Pre-Industrial Societies (Calcutta: K.P.Bagchi, 1989)
 Social Conflict and Political Unrest in Bengal 1875-1927 (Delhi: Oxford University Press, 1985)
 The Evolution of the Professional Structure in Modern India: Older and New Professions in a Changing Society (1983)
 Urban Roots of Indian Nationalism: Pressure Groups and Conflict of Interests in Calcutta City Politics, 1875-1939 (Delhi: Oxford University Press, 1979)
 Industrialization in India: Growth and Conflict in the Private Corporate Sector, 1914-47 (1979)

Articles
 "Prasanga Rabindranath: Jivandevatar Jivani" (In Bengali) [Professor Susovan Chandra Sarkar Memorial Lecture] (2012)
 "Foreword" to D.A. Low  (ed.) Congress and the Raj: Facets of the Indian Struggle 1917 - 47, (2006)
 "Indian Society and the Establishment of British Supremacy" in P.J. Marshall and Alaine Low, (eds.) The Oxford History of the British Empire, Vol. II, The Eighteenth Century, (Delhi: Oxford University Press, 1998)
 
 "Merchants and Politics: From the Great Mughals to the East India Company", with Lakshmi Subramanian, in Dwijendra Tripathi (ed.), Business and Politics in India: A historical perspective, (New Delhi, 1991)
 "The Raj, the Congress and the Bengal Gentry 1880-1905" in Rajat Kanta Ray, Basudeb Chattopadhyay and Hari S. Vasudevan (eds.), Dissent and Consensus: Protest in Pre-Industrial Societies, (Calcutta: K.P.Bagchi, 1989)
 "The Retreat of the Jotedars?" Indian Economic and Social History Review, 25. 2, 1988
 
 "The Bazar: Indigenous Sector of the Indian Economy" in Dwijendra Tripathi (ed.), Business Communities of India, (New Delhi, 1984)
 "Pedhis and Mills: The Historical Integration of Formal and Informal Sectors in the Economy of Ahmedabad", Indian Economic and Social History Review, 19:3 & 4, 1982
 (with Ratnalekha Ray), "Zamindars and Jotedars: A Study in Rural Politics in Bengal", Modern Asian Studies, Vol. 9, 1, 1975, pp. 81–102
 "The Crisis in Bengal Agriculture 1870-1927: The Dynamics of Immobility", Indian Economic and Social History Review, 10, 3, 1973, pp. 244–279
 (with Ratnalekha Ray), "The Dynamics of Continuum in Rural Bengal under the British Imperium", Indian Economic and Social History Review, 10, 2, 1973, pp. 103–128

References

Presidency University, Kolkata alumni
Bengali historians
Academic staff of Presidency University, Kolkata
Historians of South Asia
Scholars from Kolkata
20th-century Indian historians
Living people
University of Calcutta alumni
Academic staff of the Indian Institute of Management Calcutta
Academic staff of the University of Calcutta
Academic staff of Visva-Bharati University
People associated with Santiniketan
1946 births